Sinking Township is an inactive township in Dent County, in the U.S. state of Missouri.

Sinking Township was erected in 1851, taking its name from Sinking Creek.

References

Townships in Missouri
Townships in Dent County, Missouri